Ted Lewelllen (June 26, 1940 – April 30, 2006) was Professor of Anthropology at the University of Richmond. He received his B.A. from Alaska Methodist University, his M.A. from New York University, and his Ph.D. from the University of Colorado in 1977, with a thesis on "The Aymara in transition : economy and religion in a Peruvian peasant community".

He has done field work in Peru and Nicaragua and is the author of four books, some of which have been translated into Korean, French, Spanish, and Italian.   and about 20 articles. His best known are The Anthropology of Globalization (2002), and his textbook, Political Anthropology: an Introduction, which has gone into three editions.

Works

Books
Lewellen, Ted C. Political Anthropology: An Introduction. 3rd  ed. Westport, Conn: Praeger, 2003. 
Lewellen, Ted C. Political Anthropology: An Introduction.  2d ed South Hadley, Mass: Bergin & Garvey,. 1983.   
According  to WorldCat, held in 791 libraries 
Review by John A Wiseman  in Man , Sep., 1985, vol. 20, no. 3, p. 576-577 
Review  by George D Westermark; in Anthropological Quarterly, Apr., 1985, vol. 58, no. 2, p. 86-87   
Spanish translation: Lewellen, Ted C. Introducción a la antropología política. Barcelona: Bellaterra, 1985. OCLC 434641428
Italian translation, Lewellen, Ted C. Antropologia politica. Bologna: Il Mulino, 1995. 
Korean Translation: 류웰린 원저 ; 한 경구, 임 봉길 공역. 한 경구. 임 봉길. ; Ted C Lewellen; Kyŏng-gu Han; Pong-gil Im / Lewellen, Ted C., Kyŏng-gu Han, and Pong-gil Im. 정치 인류학 / Chŏngchʻi illyuhak. Sŏul Tʻŭkpyŏlsi: Ilchogak, 1998. 
Lewellen, Ted C. The Anthropology of Globalization: Cultural Anthropology Enters the 21st Century. Westport, Conn: Bergin & Garvey, 2002.  According  to WorldCat, held in 1261 libraries  
Review by Don Kalb; American Anthropologist, Jun., 2004, vol. 106, no. 2, p. 413-414 

Lewellen, Ted C. Dependency and Development: An Introduction to the Third World. Westport, Conn: Bergin & Garvey, 1995. 
Review by James W Vining; The Journal of Developing Areas, Apr., 1996, vol. 30, no. 3, p. 394-395
Review by Kenneth P Jameson Economic development and cultural change. 46, no. 3, (1998): 644
Review by James W Vining The Journal of Developing Areas. 30, no. 3, (1996): 394

Lewellen, Ted C. Peasants in Transition: The Changing Economy of the Peruvian Aymara : a General Systems Approach. Boulder, Colo: Westview Press, 1978.  
Review by Hans C Buechler;Man, Dec., 1979, vol. 14, no. 4, p. 762-763

peer-reviewed articles
(partial list):
Lewellen, Ted C. "Holy and Unholy Alliances: The Politics of Catholicism in Revolutionary Nicaragua."  Journal of Church and State. Vol. 31, no. 1 (winter 1989). p. 15 -33  
Lewellen, Ted C. 1990. "State Terror and the Disruption of Internal Adaptations by CIA Covert Actions". Scandinavian Journal of Development Alternatives. -. 923: 47-65.
Lewellen, Ted C. 1986. "The Lie File: The Political Manipulation of Central American Data by the Reagan Administration, 1981-1984". Scandinavian Journal of Development Alternatives. -. 51: 29-49.
Lewellen, Ted C. 1979. "Deviant Religion and Cultural Evolution: The Aymara Case". Journal for the Scientific Study of Religion. 18, no. 3:.
Lewellen, Ted C., et al. 1981. "Aggression and Hypoglycemia in the Andes: Another Look at the Evidence [and Comments and Replies]". Current Anthropology. 22, no. 4: 347-361.
Lewellen, Ted C. 1997 "Tropical Deforestation: The Human Dimension:" American Anthropologist, v99 n3 (199709): 643-643

References

External links

2006 deaths
1940 births
New York University alumni
University of Colorado alumni
University of Richmond faculty
20th-century American male writers